Kennedy Peak is a 10,718-foot-elevation (3,267 meter) mountain summit located in Tuolumne County, California, United States.

Description
Kennedy Peak is set in the Emigrant Wilderness on land managed by Stanislaus National Forest. The peak is situated between Kennedy Canyon and Soda Canyon, approximately three miles south of Leavitt Peak, and 0.8 mile north of line parent Molo Mountain. Precipitation runoff from this mountain drains into Kennedy Creek which is a tributary of the Stanislaus River.

Etymology
The name of the peak, lake and creek refers to Andrew L. Kennedy, who on August 27, 1886, was granted a land patent for a strip of land for grazing purposes, which included Kennedy Lake. The toponym has been officially adopted by the U.S. Board on Geographic Names.

Climate
According to the Köppen climate classification system, Kennedy Peak is located in an alpine climate zone. Most weather fronts originate in the Pacific Ocean, and travel east toward the Sierra Nevada mountains. As fronts approach, they are forced upward by the peaks (orographic lift), causing moisture in the form of rain or snowfall to drop onto the range.

See also
 
 List of peaks named Kennedy
 Night Cap Peak

Gallery

References

External links
 Weather forecast: Kennedy Peak

Mountains of Tuolumne County, California
North American 3000 m summits
Mountains of Northern California
Sierra Nevada (United States)
Stanislaus National Forest